Rouvray is a commune in the Eure department in northern France.

Population

Sights
The Rouvray chapel rises along the road to the hamlet of Cocherel. Local tradition suggests that the chapel was part of a bigger church that was demolished. Dedicated to St. Martin, the chapel dates from the late fifteenth or early sixteenth century, but from the eleventh century, a church belonging to the monks of Jumièges is known to have existed at Rouvray.

See also
Communes of the Eure department

References

Communes of Eure